Rhinolophus microglobosus is a species of horseshoe bat found in Southeast Asia.

Taxonomy and etymology
It was described as a subspecies of the lesser brown horseshoe bat in 1998, with the trinomen Rhinolophus stheno microglobosus. The holotype was collected in Na Hang Nature Reserve in Vietnam in 1996.
In 2008, Soisook et al. published that R. s. microglobosus should be considered a full species based on distinct morphology and echolocation characteristics.
The species name "microglobosus" "refers to the size and shape of the median anterior rostral swellings which are considerably smaller than those of R. stheno."

Description
Relative to other horseshoe bats, it is medium-sized. Individuals weigh . Its dorsal fur is bicolored, with the basal portions of the hairs yellowish-brown and the distal portions cinnamon-brown. Its ventral fur is paler in color. Its flight membranes are all dark brown.

Range and habitat
It is found in several countries in Southeast Asia, including: Cambodia, Laos, Myanmar, Thailand, and Vietnam.

Conservation
As of 2017, it is evaluated as a least-concern species by the IUCN.

References

Bats of Southeast Asia
Mammals described in 1998
Rhinolophidae